Truchas Peak (more precisely, South Truchas Peak) is the second highest peak in the U.S. State of New Mexico behind Wheeler Peak. It lies within the Pecos Wilderness, part of the Santa Fe National Forest. (The north end of the mountain borders on the Carson National Forest.) The name of the peak is Spanish for "trout" (plural). It is the highest point in both Rio Arriba and Mora counties. It is also the most southerly peak and land area in the continental United States to rise above .

The entire mountain is a small north-south trending massif with four identifiable summits, North Truchas Peak, Middle Truchas Peak, "Medio Truchas Peak" (unofficial name), and South Truchas Peak, the highest. Of the three subsidiary summits, only North Truchas Peak has enough topographic prominence (about ) to be considered an independent peak.

The Truchas Peaks lie on the divide between the Rio Grande and the Pecos River. They are drained on the west by the Rio Medio, the Rio Quemado, and the Rio de las Trampas; on the northeast by the Rio Santa Barbara; and on the southeast by small creeks that quickly run into the upper reaches of the Pecos River. The massif also connects to numerous other high peaks in the region, many via the Santa Barbara Divide, a major east-west high ridge which separates the Pecos watershed on the south from the Santa Barbara watershed to the north.

The Truchas group has a true wilderness character, as it is difficult to access the peaks within a single day. Many trails access the slopes of the peaks, most notably the Skyline Trail (Trail number 251), which traverses the eastern slopes at elevation around 12,000 feet (3,660 m) and accesses the Truchas Lakes, a set of small lakes in a cirque below the south side of North Truchas Peak.

See also
 Mountain peaks of North America
 Mountain peaks of the Rocky Mountains
 Mountain peaks of the United States
 Southern Rocky Mountains

References

External links
 
 
 

Mountains of New Mexico
Sangre de Cristo Mountains
Landforms of Mora County, New Mexico
Landforms of Rio Arriba County, New Mexico
Santa Fe National Forest
Carson National Forest
Mountains of Rio Arriba County, New Mexico
Mountains of Mora County, New Mexico